Renaldo Angelo "Reni" Masi  (born August 12, 1933 in Nanaimo, British Columbia), the son of Cyril and Mabel Masi.  He grew up in East Vancouver, where he attended Hastings and Templeton Secondary School before attending Normal School and completing his education at the University of British Columbia.  He started teaching in Surrey, British Columbia in 1956 at Queen Elizabeth Secondary School.  After a lifetime of community building, he turned his efforts to politics and served as a BC Liberal Member of the Legislative Assembly of British Columbia from 1996 to 2005, representing the riding of Delta North.

References

British Columbia Liberal Party MLAs
Living people
21st-century Canadian politicians
1933 births